Igor Gennadyevich Mikhalkin (born 31 May 1985) is a Russian professional boxer. He held the IBO light-heavyweight title from 2017 to 2018 and challenged once for the WBO light-heavyweight title in 2018. At regional level, he held the European light-heavyweight title between 2014 and 2016.

Professional career
Mikhalkin made his professional debut in November 2007. On his 12th professional contest, he suffered a loss to Aleksy Kuziemski. In April 2014, Mikhalkin defeated Mohamed Belkacem by unanimous decision to claim the European light-heavyweight title. He made three successful defenses of that title, with the last coming against Patrick Bois in March 2016. During his tenure as European champion, Mikhalkin was highly ranked by the IBF.

Prior to his continental title defense against Bois, Mikhalkin tested positive and admitted to taking meldonium, a substance banned by WADA and was stripped by the EBU. He was also banned for two years by the EBU. The suspension was lifted in November of that same year.

Mikhalkin vs. Oosthuizen 
In May 2017, Mikhalkin defeated Thomas Oosthuizen to claim the IBO light-heavyweight title.

Mikhalkin vs. Kovalev 
On March 3, 2018, Mikhalkin challenged WBO light heavyweight champion Sergey Kovalev for his belt. Kovalev defeated Mikhalkin in the seventh round via TKO.

Mikhalkin vs. Bauderlique 
On September, 10, 2021, Mikhalkin fought Mathieu Bauderlique, ranked #5 by the WBC, #9 by the IBF, #10 by the WBA and #12 by the WBA at light heavyweight. Mikhalkin lost the bout after retiring at the end of the seventh round.

Professional boxing record

References

External links

Igor Mikhalkin - Profile, News Archive & Current Rankings at Box.Live

1985 births
Russian male boxers
Living people
Light-heavyweight boxers
Sportspeople from Irkutsk
Russian sportspeople in doping cases